n0n is the second studio album by industrial/experimental metal band The Amenta. It was released in 2008, and coincided with a national tour. Nergal (Behemoth), Alex Pope (Ruins) and Alice Daquet (Sir Alice) all make guest appearances on this album.

Track listing
 "On" - 0:44
 "Junky" - 4:57
 "Vermin" - 4:03
 "Entropy" - 1:45
 "Slave" - 5:12
 "Whore" - 4:55
 "Spine" - 4:08
 "Skin" - 3:25
 "Dirt" - 5:53
 "Atrophy" - 01:48
 "Cancer" - 05:22
 "Rape" - 06:53

Credits

Personnel
Jarrod Krafczyk - vocals
Erik Miehs - guitar (all tracks), bass guitar (tracks 1-7, 9-12)
Timothy Pope - keyboards, samples
Dave Haley - drums (tracks 1-7, 9-12)

Additional personnel
Nick Readh - drums (track 8)
Adam 'Nergel' Darski - vocals (track 5)
Alex Pope - vocals (track 9)
Alice Daquet - vocals (track 8)
Nathan Jenkins - bass guitar (track 8)
Nathan Wyner - vocals (track 7)

Production
Chad Halford - additional engineer
Lachlan Mitchell - mixing
Steve Smart - mastering
Sven de Caluwé - artwork, layout

References

2008 albums
The Amenta albums